Glipostenoda cinnamonea is a species of beetle in the genus Glipostenoda. It was described in 1953.

References

cinnamonea
Beetles described in 1953